The GOLFO is a combat helmet of Chilean origin issued to the Chilean Army. The helmet is produced locally by the Chilean private firm Baselli Hermanos Brothers S.A. and was first introduced in 2000; Made of kevlar, it is capable of stopping a 9×19mm round at 310m.

Development
In January 2006, the Chilean Army issued the Technical Specification CAK-5024 requesting a combat helmet with specific requirements (Protection Level:IIIA according to method NIJ Standard-0101.04.). The "RBH-303 Classic" PASGT-shaped ballistic helmet made by Rabintex Industries Ltd of Israel was selected and adopted in 2000 for Chilean Army usage as the "Rabintex 303 GOLFO." The Chilean-produced version retains the U.S. PASGT helmet shape but is fitted with a European-style head liner.

Users
: Chilean Army

See also
OR-201
PASGT

References

External links
 Official Website
 Baselli Hermanos products

Combat helmets
Military equipment introduced in the 2000s